The six-hour day is a schedule by which the employees or other members of an institution (which may also be, for example, a school) spend six hours contributing. This is in contrast to the widespread eight-hour day, or any other time arrangement. It has also been proposed as a better alternative to the four-day week, another proposed way to reduce working time.

By country

Australia
In Australia, the six-hour day and four-day week is supported by the Australian Greens.

Finland 
In 2020, the Finnish Prime Minister Sanna Marin advocated for a change towards implementing a six-hour working day.

The result of a Finnish study showed positive effects.

Norway 
The Red Party (Norway) has advocated for a six-hour workday.

Sweden 
The 6 hour workday has been subject to reoccurring debate since the early 70's after the prominent sociologist and politician Alva Myrdal proposed to implement it to Sveriges socialdemokratiska kvinnoförbund. Today there is more than a few examples of companies which already have a 6 hour workday in Sweden, and the notion of a trend towards a six-hour workday has also been mentioned. Since 2002 there is a workplace with a 6 hour workday in the small town of Mölndal. This led to higher profitability, implemented without any decrease in wages. One of the people who works at the company claimed that "You have more energy. You're more alret. More efficient. I promise: you peform 20-30 % more in six hours than eight.("Man orkar mera. Är piggare. Effektivare. Jag lovar: Man presterar 20–30 procent mer på sex timmar än på åtta.") Several small-scale implementations of the concept have been trialed in Sweden, including the private and public sectors. In Gothenburg, an experiment with 70 nurses over 18 months found decreases in sick leave, better self-reported health as well as an increase in productivity, with a cost of 1,3 million USD. Two major parties support cutting the working hours in Sweden as of 2022. The party Vänsterpartiet (the left party) is advocating a 6 hour working day without decreased pay. Miljöpartiet de gröna (The green party) has the goal of a 30 hour workweek. About half of Swedes would rather have to work fewer hours rather than getting paid more, with women being more positive towards more free time. The majority of Swedes are in favour of shorter working weeks, with the greatest support from women and people who are engaged in so called blue-collar jobs.

See also 

 Critique of work
 35-hour workweek
 Four-day workweek
 Three-Day Week
 Working time
 Weekend

References 

Working time
Labor rights